Feeling Fine is a 2010 single release by Scottish recording artist Alex Gardner, released in the United Kingdom and Ireland on 27 September 2010. The song was produced by production duo Xenomania.

Reception

Reviews

 ‘Feeling Fine’ hears the Scottish lad skilfully manoeuvre around the verses in a falsetto, recalling the tenderness of his ballad ‘There Goes My Heart’. Much like my impressions of Girls Aloud‘s ‘Crocodile Tears’, ‘Feeling Fine’ didn’t strike me as a potential until I woke up one morning with its chorus ringing in my head. Ta-dah! We have another slow-revealing Xenomania pop gem at hand. - Feed Limmy
 ‘Feeling Fine’ is a heady blend of electronica, R’n’B and dancefloor flavours wrapped up in a perfect pop package and showcases Alex’s accomplished, soul-packed vocal, which impressively swoops up to giddy falsetto heights. - Female First
 “Feeling Fine” follows the lead of “I’m not Mad” as another top Xenomania tune. Granted, I have no idea what the hell he’s saying on the Ke$ha-fied chorus, but I know that I like it. No, scratch that – I love it.
Naturally, Alex’s voice is built for acoustic rock and blue-eyed soul, so hearing his raspy vocals against the sleek backdrop of Xenomania’s perfect productions completely adds new dimensions to tunes that may have sounded a lot more standard in the hands of somebody else. - The Prophet Blog

Track listing

1. "Feeling Fine" - 3:38 
2. "I Wanna Be With Her"

References 

2010 singles
Alex Gardner (singer) songs
Song recordings produced by Xenomania
Songs written by Brian Higgins (producer)
2010 songs
A&M Records singles